Marillac College was a Catholic sisters' college in St. Louis, Missouri.  Like other sisters' colleges, it was dedicated to the education of future nuns and other religious workers, though it was also open to members of the laity.  It closed in 1974.

Description
Operated by the Daughters of Charity, the college was named after the order's co-founder, Saint Louise de Marillac. It opened in 1955 and was first accredited in 1960. Unlike some sisters' colleges, it had a full four-year Bachelor's-granting program.  Aside from theological and philosophical fields, instruction was given in secular subjects, including nursing, mathematics, optometry, English, and American studies.  The major buildings were designed by Chicago architect Edo Belli, whose firm conducted a longstanding collaboration with the Daughters of Charity in several states.

The Marillac campus was acquired by the University of Missouri–St. Louis by 1976.

See also
 List of current and historical women's universities and colleges

References
Daughter of Charity Provincial Archives
Higher Learning Commission: Marillac College

Educational institutions established in 1955
Defunct private universities and colleges in Missouri
Defunct Catholic universities and colleges in the United States
Universities and colleges in St. Louis County, Missouri
History of St. Louis County, Missouri
Educational institutions disestablished in 1974
1955 establishments in Missouri
Catholic universities and colleges in Missouri
Roman Catholic Archdiocese of St. Louis
Sisters' colleges